Gnomidolon melanosomum is a species of beetle in the family Cerambycidae. It was described by 1870.

References

Gnomidolon
Beetles described in 1870